The Surrogate Mother  ( Pokhnak mairy) is an Armenian romantic drama television series. The series premiered on Shant TV on September 2, 2016.
The series is taking place in Yerevan, Armenia. TV series' director is Artyom Haroutyunian, co-director Hayk Vardanyan.

Series overview

Series overview

Cast and characters
 Marinka Khachatryan portrays Sona (The surrogate mother)
 Anahit Kocharyan portrays Maro Sona's aunt
 Hayk Petrosyan  portrays Aram Karamyan Husband of Elen
 Tigran Nersisyan portrays Arsen Rushanyan Father of Elen
 Hovak Galoyan portrays Avet Karamyan Father of Aram
 Yelena Borisenko portrays Gayane Mother of Elen
 Eva Baghdasaryan portrays Elen Rushanyan Woman of Aram, daughter of Arsen and Gayane
 Armen Dallakyan portrays Tosh Friend of Masha and Elen
 Tamara Gevorgyan portrays Kiki Friend of Elen
 Lia Zakharyan portrays Masha Friend of Elen
 Ani Bayatyan portrays Djina Women's colony prisoner
 Sevak Santrosyan portrays Amirbekyan
 Djulieta Babayan
Source 1 = 
Source 2 =

References

External links
 
 The surrogate mother on Armserial
 The surrogate mother on ArmFilm

Armenian drama television series
Armenian-language television shows
Shant TV original programming
2016 Armenian television series debuts
2010s Armenian television series